Buxus 'Green Velvet'  or Green Velvet Boxwood is a hybrid boxwood cultivar. Its parent species are B. sempervirens × B. microphylla var. koreana. The leaves are evergreen, glossy and borne oppositely. It has small pale green flowers. If not pruned this shrub will develop a natural rounded shape. Buxus Green Velvet is a hybrid between  Buxus sempervirens and buxus microphylla var. Koreana.

Care 
Green Velvet Boxwoods require partial to full sun in order to survive. Water the plant at least once weekly, more in severe heat. The soil needs to be moist but not wet. The plant should be watered daily if kept in a container.   Buxus Green Velvet can survive in temperatures ranging from -10 degrees Fahrenheit to 0 degrees Fahrenheit

See also
 Boxwood blight
 Box tree moth
 Gothic boxwood miniature

References

Green Velvet
Ornamental plant cultivars